Moffat Johnston (18861935) was a Scottish-born actor with a substantial United States stage career.

Career
Johnston was born to John Moffat Johnston and Margaret Parke (Boyd). He was educated at Watson's School and the University of Edinburgh. He made his stage debut in 1905 at Theatre Royal, Manchester in Frank Benson's company and went on with them to perform more than 200 Shakespearean roles. In 1914 he toured with his own theatre company in Germany before the outbreak of World War I. During the war he was a Lieutenant of the 8th Sherwood Foresters. He returned to theatrical work after the war making his American debut in 1922 in the world premier of George Bernard Shaw's Back to Methuselah.<ref>Who Was Who in the Theatre:1912-1976 vol.3 I-P p.1309 ; compiled from editions originally published annually by John Parker. 1976 version by Gale Research </ref> Johnston appeared in several important Broadway productions in the 1920s, such as Methuselah, R. U. R., Six Characters in Search of an Author and the 1923 production of John Barrymore's Hamlet. Johnston created the role of Oscar Jaffe in the 1932 play Twentieth Century, which was later turned into a film and a musical.   He also appeared  with Lillian Gish in 1934's Within the Gates and his last role before his death in The Flowers of the Forest with Burgess Meredith and Katharine Cornell.

Moffat's wife Winifred, also an actor, occasionally appeared on Broadway in plays with him. She performed under the name Winifred Johnston in the 1923 production of King Lear and the 1931 productions of The Streets of New York, or Poverty is No Crime.  Their son Peter Johnston also appeared on Broadway during the 1930s.

Moffat taught at Royal Academy of Dramatic Art in London.

Devoted to the stage, Johnston only appeared in two films: a 1911 Shakespearean silent Richard III starring Frank Benson and the 1934 sound drama Midnight''.

He died after appendicitis surgery in 1935.

Filmography

References

External links

portrait(NY Public Library)
playbill for the play Twentieth Century with Johnston and Eugenie Leontovich
ForgottenActors, 2013

1886 births
1935 deaths
Male actors from Edinburgh
Alumni of RADA
Deaths from appendicitis
20th-century Scottish male actors
Scottish male stage actors
Scottish male film actors
British expatriate male actors in the United States